The Wych Elm cultivar Ulmus glabra 'Oblongata' was identified as Ulmus oblongata by Koch in Dendrologie; Bäume, Sträucher und Halbsträucher, welche in Mittel- und Nord- Europa im Freien kultivirt werden 2 (1): 415, 1872.

Description
The tree was described as having a broad, oblong leaf without apical teeth.

Cultivation
No specimens are known to survive.

References

External links
  Sheet labelled U. glabra Huds. var. oblonga (showing supernumerary leaves)
 Herbarium specimen of U. montana oblongata, science.udau.edu.ua

Wych elm cultivar
Ulmus articles missing images
Ulmus
Missing elm cultivars